The Golden Isles Terminal Railroad is a terminal railroad that began operations in 1998, taking over from the Colonel's Island Railroad. It operates 33 miles of track in and around the port at Brunswick, GA.  Starting in 1998, it is owned by Genesee & Wyoming Inc.

References

External links

Official website

Georgia (U.S. state) railroads
Switching and terminal railroads
Genesee & Wyoming